Ikeja is the capital city of Lagos State in southwestern Nigeria. Its population, as of the 2006 census, is 313,196. Prior to the emergence of military rule in the early 1980s, Ikeja was a well planned, clean and quiet residential and commercial town with shopping malls, pharmacies and government reservation areas. It lies 10.5 miles (17 km) northwest of Lagos city. The Murtala Muhammed International Airport is located in the city. Ikeja is also home to Femi Kuti's Africa Shrine and Lagbaja's Motherland, both venues for live music. Its Ikeja City Mall is the largest mall on the Lagos State mainland. Ikeja also has its own radio station, broadcasting both in English (Eko FM) and in Yoruba (Radio Lagos).

History
Ikeja, which was formally called "Akeja", was named after a deity of the Awori people of Ota. It was originally settled by the Awori people, and the area was raided for slaves until the mid-19th century. Early in the 20th century it became an agricultural hinterland for Lagos. The opening of the Lagos-Ibadan railway in 1901 and the growth of Lagos as a port transformed Ikeja into a residential and industrial suburb of that city. In the mid-1960s an industrial estate was established, and in 1976 Ikeja became the capital of Lagos state.

Government and Infrastructure
The local government administrative headquarters of Ikeja is located within the Ikeja Local Government premises. As of June 2019, the Chairman (Mayor) of Ikeja's local government is Engr. Mojeed Balogun.

The Federal Airports Authority of Nigeria has its headquarters in Ikeja on the grounds of Murtala Muhammad Airport. The Accident Investigation Bureau of the Nigerian government is headquartered in Ikeja. The Nigerian Civil Aviation Authority (NCAA) has its head office in Aviation House on the grounds of the airport; this was formerly just the Lagos office.

Economy
Several airlines have their head offices located in Ikeja. Arik Air's head office is in the Arik Air Aviation Centre on the grounds of Murtala Muhammed Airport. Aero Contractors has its head office on the grounds of Murtala Muhammed Airport. Other airlines with Ikeja head offices include Overland Airways, Air Peace, Associated Aviation, and Dana Air. In addition, Virgin Atlantic has its Nigerian office in "The Place" in Ikeja.

At one point, Nigeria Airways had its head office in Airways House. Before it was dissolved, Afrijet Airlines had its head office in the NAHCO Building on the grounds of the airport. Bellview Airlines had its headquarters in the Bellview Plaza. Other now-defunct airlines with head offices in Ikeja include Air Nigeria (formerly Nigerian Eagle and Virgin Nigeria Airways), on the 9th Floor of Etiebets Place, Sosoliso Airlines, and ADC Airlines.

A slum in Ikeja was selected by C. J. Obasi as a production location for the 2014 Nollywood thriller, Ojuju.

Ikeja also has a main market area called Ipodo Market. This market contains many shops and makeshift stalls where merchants display and sell produce, meat, fish, grains, and other groceries.

Communities
Districts in the city include:

 Anifowose;
 Oregun;
 Ojodu;
 Opebi;
 Akiode;
 Alausa;
 Agidingbi;
 Ogba;
 Magodo;
 Maryland;
 Onigbongbo;
 Government Reserved Area (GRA) Ikeja.

Computer Village

Ikeja is home to a large computer market, popularly known as Otigba. Begun in 1997 as a small market of only 10 shops, the current market now has well over 3000. While most vendors provide the expected computer sales and repair services, it is also possible to find sales and repair services for various types of office equipment and electronic devices.

By 2019, the little shops at Computer Village had grown to multiple-storey shopping malls. Many of the single-floor buildings have been developed into larger buildings, housing several shops that distribute and repair mobile phones, laptops, printers and other electronic devices. Nearly all the major Nigerian banks have branches around the market.

As the market is unplanned, it has experienced difficulties in its growth, with some local residents expressing frustration at the market's expansion. Traffic around the area has become very congested, and it can be almost impossible to find a place to park. Furthermore, the electrical infrastructure, which was already unreliable, has become overloaded by the new market, which requires significant amounts of electricity to demonstrate working computer products to potential customers.

Tourist centres 

 Isheri/River Ogun – Cradle of Awori and Lagos indigenous population
 Lagos State Government Secretariat Ikeja House, Alausa, Ikeja
 Lagos State House of Assembly Complex [Parliament Building], Alausa, Ikeja
 Lagos State Records and Archives Bureau, PSSDC Road, Magodo, Kosofe
 Lagos Television and Radio Lagos/Eko F.M, Agidingbi, Ikeja
 LASU Ethnography Museum, Oba Ogunji Road, Ogba, Agege
 Murtala Mohammed International Airport, Ikeja [Hub of aviation in West Africa]
 Statue of Lagos Idejo Chiefs – megacity’s traditional land gentry
 Third Mainland Bridge/Outer Ring Road Complex.

Gallery

See also 

Railway stations in Nigeria
Eko Hospital
Surulere

References 

State capitals in Nigeria
Local Government Areas in Lagos State
Local Government Areas in Yorubaland